The Banū Hāshim is an Arab clan within the Quraysh tribe to which Muhammad belonged, named after Muhammad's great-grandfather Hashim ibn Abd Manaf.

Members of this clan, and especially their descendants, are also referred to as Hashimids, Hashimites, or Hashemites, and often carry the surname .

From the 8th century on, Hashimid descent came to be regarded as a mark of nobility, and formed the basis upon which many dynasties legitimized their rule. Some of the most famous Islamic dynasties of Hashimid descent include the Abbasids (ruled from Baghdad 750–945; held the caliphate without exercising power 945–1258 in Baghdad and 1261–1517 in Cairo), the Fatimids (ruled from Cairo and claimed the caliphate 909–1171), the Alaouit (rulers of Morocco, 1631–present), and the Hashemites (rulers of Jordan, 1921–present).

History
Traditionally, the tribe is named after Hashim ibn Abd Manaf. He was married to Salma bint Amr of the Banu Najjar, an Azdi clan.

Amongst pre-Islamic Arabs, people classified themselves according to their tribe, their clan, and then their house/family. There were two major tribal kinds: the Adnanites (descended from Adnan, traditional ancestor of the Arabs of northern, central and western Arabia) and the Qahtanites (originating from Qahtan, the traditional ancestor of the Arabs of southern and south eastern Arabia). Banu Hashim is one of the clans of the Quraysh tribe, and is an Adnanite tribe. It derives its name from Hashim ibn Abd Manaf, the great-grandfather of Muhammad, and along with the Banu Abd-Shams, Banu Al-Muttalib, and Banu Nawfal clans comprises the Banu Abd al-Manaf section of the Quraysh.

The House of Abdul-Muttalib of Banu Hashim comprised nobility in Pre-Islamic Mecca. This was based on their hereditary duty to act as stewards and caretakers of the pilgrims coming to Mecca to worship at the Kaaba, the sacred shrine that in Islamic tradition was built by Ibrahim (Abraham) and his first-born son and heir Ismail (Ishmael) was a Monotheist site of worship.

With time, the Kaaba had come to be occupied by some hundreds of idols. Visiting of these idols by the different tribes caused traffic which added considerably to the wealth of the merchants of Mecca, which also benefited from its position astride the caravan routes from Yemen (Arabia Felix) up to the Mediterranean markets.

It was into the House 'Abd al-Muttalib of Banu Hashim of Quraysh that Muhammad was born. At the age of 40, his establishment of Islam set him at odds with the established powers in Mecca. His membership of the 'top house, of the top clan' (in terms of prestige and power) was a factor (according to Islamic tradition) through which God kept him safe from assassination during the early years of his mission, as a number of his uncles would not countenance any such insult to their so-called clan honour. After 13 years, the Muslim community of Mecca migrated (made Hijrah) to the city of Yathrib (which subsequently became known as Medina) to avoid their often murderous persecution by the non-believers of Mecca. With the conquest of Mecca, the city was captured by the army of Islam. The Kaabah was cleansed of idols and became the centre of pilgrimage for Muslims, once again the centre of pure Abrahamic monotheism. (It is illegal for non-Muslims to enter an area designated surrounding the city of Mecca).

The two major lines of descent of Muhammad are those of his two grandsons, Al-Hasan and Al-Husain, born of the union of his daughter Fatimah and his cousin and son-in-law Ali. Muhammad besought the love of the Muslims on his grandsons, thus their descendants have become spiritual aristocracy among the Muslims. The descendants of the Banu Hashim are known by the titles of Saiyed, Sayed, Sayyid, Syed and Sharif.

In the 19th Century CE, to try to resolve the confusion surrounding the descendants of Muhammad, the Ottoman Caliphs attempted to replicate the Almanach de Gotha (the tome listing the noble houses of Europe) to show known and verifiable lines of descent. Although not 100% complete in its scope the resulting Kitab al-Ashraf (Book of the Sharifs), kept at the Topkapı Palace in Istanbul is one of the best sources of evidence of descent from Muhammad.
The Alids (the term given to the descendants of Muhammad via his daughter Fatima and Ali) lines of descent produced many once, present (and future) reigning dynasties across the Islamic imperium, amongst these stand:

Dynasties 
The following Royal and Imperial dynasties claim descent from Hashim:

Europe
 Hummudid Dynasty (through Idris ibn Abdullah)
 
Arabia 
 Hashemite Dynasty (through Qatadah ibn Idris)
 Abbasid dynasty of the Abbasid Caliphate (through Abbas ibn Abd al-Muttalib)
 Abbasids of Cairo, the ceremonial heads of Mamluk Sultanate from 1261 to 1517. (descendent of Abu al-Abbas Ahmad al-Hakim)
 Fatimid Dynasty of the Fatimid Empire including the later Agha Khans. (through Ismail ibn Jafar)
Rassid Dynasty of Yemen (through Ibrahim al Jamr bin Hassan al Muthanna)
 Mutawakkilite Dynasty of Yemen (through Ibrahim al Jamr bin Hassan al Muthanna as cadets of the Rassid Dynasty)
Africa
 'Alawi dynasty of Morocco (through Muhammad al-Nafs al-Zakiyah bin Abdullah al-Kamal)
 Sa'di dynasty of Morocco (through Muhammad al-Nafs al-Zakiyah bin Abdullah al-Kamal)
 Idrisid dynasty of Morocco (through Idris ibn Abdullah)
 Senussi Dynasty of Libya (through Idris ibn Abdullah as cadets of the Idrisid Dynasty)
 Ishaqids:
Tolje'lo Dynasty of the Isaaq Sultanate (through Sheikh Ishaaq bin Ahmed)
Guled Dynasty of the Isaaq Sultanate (through Sheikh Ishaaq bin Ahmed)
 Ainanshe Dynasty of the Habr Yunis Sultanate (through Sheikh Ishaaq bin Ahmed)

Indo-Persia
 Alids of Tabaristan (through Zayd bin Hassan al Muthana)
 Zaydi Dynasty of Tabaristan (through Zayd ibn Ali)
 Barha Dynasty Including the later Nawabs of Samballhera (through Zayd ibn Ali)
 Rohilla Dynasty including the later Nawabs of Rampur (through Zayd ibn Ali as Cadets of the Barha Dynasty)
 The Agha Khans (Through Ismail ibn Jafar as cadets of the Fatimid Dynasty)
 Daudpota Dynasty including the later Nawabs of Bhawalpur and Sindh (Kalhora) (through Abbas ibn Muttalib)
 The Sultans of Mysore (lineage of the Hashemite tribe) 
 Sabzwari Dynasty (through Ali al Reza)
 Najafi Dynasty of Bengal. Including the later Nawabs of Murshidabad and the Tabatabai family of Iran (through Ibrahim Tabataba ibn Ismail al Dibaj)

East Asia
 Sultans of Siak (through Ahmad al Muhajir as cadets of the Ba alawai)
 Bendahara Dynasty of Pahang and Terengannu (through Ahmad al Muhajir as cadets of the Ba alawai)
 Bolkiah Dynasty of Brunei (through Ahmad al Muhajir as cadets of the Ba alawai)
 Jamal al layl dynasty of Perak and Perlis (through Ahmad al Muhajir as cadets of the Ba alawai)
 Sultans of Pontianak (through Ahmad al Muhajir as cadets of the Ba alawai)
 House of Temenggong of Johor (as cadet branches of Bendahara Dynasty)

Family tree

 Note that direct lineage is marked in bold.

See also
Non-Muslims who interacted with Muslims during Muhammad's era
Abbasid caliphs
Abbasid architecture
Hashmi
Sayyid
Awan (tribe)
Husseini
Umayyads
Umayyad Caliphate
Abbasid Caliphate
Family tree of Muhammad
Quraysh

References

Sources

External links
Ba'Alawi (Al Husayni Al Hashimi Al Qurayshi) Sadah of Hadhramaut
Banu Hashim – Before the Birth of Islam
Genealogy of the Hashemite Banu Abbas.

 
Tribes of Arabia
Family of Muhammad
Hashemite people
Sunni Islam
Quraysh

fi:Banū Hāshim
sv:Hashim